Clay Rose (born in Lafayette, Colorado, United States) is an American visual artist, singer, songwriter, and rhythm guitarist. Rose attended high school in Tennessee and moved to Colorado at the age of 22.

Rose is the front-man for Gasoline Lollipops. Rose and Gasoline Lollipops were featured in the Westword Music Showcase in 2017. Gasoline Lollipops have played many iconic Colorado venues, including Red Rocks, Bluebird Theater, Aggie Theater (Fort Collins, CO), and Fox Theater.

Rose also writes and plays under his alter ego, Governor Mortimer Leech, front-man of The Widow's Bane. The Widow's Bane was voted "Best Secret Identity Band (2016)".

Press
The Widow's Bane Rare Appearance
Gasoline Lollipops: Through a filter of romance
Celebrating 25 Years of the Westword Music Showcase: Gasoline Lollipops

Gasoline Lollipops: Ready to Set Fire to Belgium (Discovering Belgium)

Gasoline Lollipops Gear Up for a New Beginning (Bolder Beat)

From an empty Gold Hill Inn, streaming to fans’ homes, it’s Clay Rose and Adam Perry live (Boulder Daily Camera)

Through barroom sets, Gasoline Lollipops’ Clay Rose finds strength in sobriety (Denver Post)

A Side of Rockers, A Side of Ballads (Boulder Weekly)

Gasoline Lollipops 'Soul Mine' Premiere (Pop Matters)

Gasoline Lollipops' Clay Rose Barely Survived Himself (Denver Westword)

Boulder's Clay Rose and Wonderbound Ballet Explore Loss and Love In "The Sandman" Ballet (Colorado Daily, 2020)

Gasoline Lollipops Skewer Trump On All The Misery Money Can Buy (Denver Westword, 2020)

Gasoline Lollipops Get Fired Up Talking About All The Misery Money Can Buy (American Songwriter, 2020)

Gasoline Lollipops to Play In-Person Concerts At Red Rocks (Denver Post, 2020)

Adam Perry On Making Music with Clay Rose of Gasoline Lollipops (Denver Westword, January 2021)

Discography

Gasoline Lollipops
Dawn (May 2, 2013)
Death (October 31, 2014)
Resurrection (February 14, 2017)
Soul Mine (December 26, 2017)

All The Misery Money Can Buy (September 11, 2020)

Nightmares (October 14th, 2022)

The Widow's Bane
The Widow's Bane (2009)
Don't be Afraid; It's Only Death (June 6, 2013)

Clay Rose
Smoke and Steam (July 7, 2005)
Suck on This! EP (March 17, 2006)

References

 

Musicians from Colorado
Living people
21st-century American singers
Musicians from Tennessee
People from Franklin, Tennessee
Year of birth missing (living people)
American artists
Songwriters from Colorado
21st-century American guitarists
American folk musicians
American rockabilly musicians